Partha Pratim Chowdhury (1938—1996) was a Bengali Indian theater and film director and play writer.

Early years and education
He studied at the Scottish Church College of the University of Calcutta. Along with other future luminaries of the Bengali theatre, Badal Sircar, Rudraprasad Sengupta, and Manoj Mitra, among others, he was initiated into the theatre world during his college years.

Career
 He had started a theatre group Sundaram in 1957. Later he moved on to filmmaking.

Filmography

As director
Chhaya Surya (1963) 
Subha O Debatar Gras (1965)
Dolna (1965)
Hangsa-Mithun (1968)
Jadu Bangsha (1974)
Subho Kemon Achho (Canvas) 1978
 Rajbabhu (1982)
 Pujarini (1984)

As writer
Chhaya Surya (1963) 
Hangsa-Mithun (1968)
Parineeta (1969)
Jadu Bangsha (1974)
Troyee (1982)
 Rajbabhu (1982)
 Pujarini (1984)

As cinematographer
 Rajbabhu (1982)
 Pujarini (1984)

As music director
 Indranath Srikanta O Annadadidi (1959)
 Rajbabhu (1982)
 Pujarini (1984)
  Sargam

As actor
 Indranath Srikanta O Annadadidi (1959)
 Rajbabhu (1982)

As producer
Jadu Bangsha (1974).

He had also worked as an assistant director in the popular Bengali film Deep Jwele Jaai.

References

External links
 

1938 births
1996 deaths
Scottish Church College alumni
University of Calcutta alumni
Indian theatre directors
Indian male dramatists and playwrights
Male actors in Bengali cinema
Bengali film directors
Bengali theatre personalities
20th-century Indian dramatists and playwrights
20th-century Indian male actors
20th-century Indian film directors
20th-century Indian male writers
Film directors from Kolkata